Uropsalis is a genus of nightjar in the family Caprimulgidae. 
It contains the following species:

 
Bird genera
Taxonomy articles created by Polbot